Saint Alberts High School is a coeducational Roman Catholic Church mission high school that also provides boarding for students. It is situated in the Mashonaland Central province of Zimbabwe, on the escarpment overlooking the Zambezi Valley in northern Zimbabwe near the Mozambique border. It is above this escarpment which is also popularly known as the Mavhuradonha Mountain range. The Valley below is also known as Dande. St. Alberts, which is located in a pristine area between Mt Darwin and Centenary, in a region of temperate weather.

History

The school was founded in the 1970s by the Jesuit society of the Roman Catholic Church. In July 1973, Zimbabwe African National Liberation Army (ZANLA) cadres captured 292 pupils and staff from the school and force-marched them north towards Mozambique, where the ZANLA bases were. The march was intercepted by the Rhodesian Security Forces before it crossed the border and all but eight of the children and staff were recovered. The school was closed in the late 1970s at the height of the Rhodesian Bush War.

In 1981, the school was reopened with around 120 students in Form One. Its first headmaster after the war was Celestine Mtandadzi (died 28 July 2007). His deputy was Cannan Chabayanzara (died 2003). Initially, the school had a total of four teachers. The school grew with each passing year; by 1984, it had forms one to four. The school added buildings to accommodate the increased class size.

St Alberts had teachers whose appreciation of drama and theatre led the school to build theatres not only for the students, but for the surrounding communities. Among these teachers was George Mujajati, who went on to write novels and plays like "Victory" and "The Wretched One". St Alberts won several drama trophies under its teacher and chief drama master Gonzo Habbakuk Msengezi.  He became the first writer in Zimbabwe to be pursued by the Secret Police after writing books like "Zvairwadza Vasara" and "The Honourable MP".

St Alberts opened its doors to A-level students in 1987. It started with only arts students, as the school was still in the process of building science laboratories.

The school was involved in agriculture projects, as it had a large student garden. It also kept cattle, pigs and goats. However, a new Roman Catholic Father Superior Father Von Walter who hated the agriculture projects caused the closure of the gardens as a result of conflicts with the headmaster Mtandadzi. Mtandadzi had to leave the school in 1990, becoming an Education Officer. Some of the Headmasters who have been at this school include Chidavaenzi and Donato.

Houses
St Alberts has four competing students' houses:
 Silveira, which wears yellow;
 Miguel, which wears red;
 St Augustine, which wears green; and
 St Martins, which wears white.
It has three academic classes which go under the names of Zimbabwe's most notable historical persons Nehanda, Kaguvi and Munhumutapa.

Athletic achievements
St Alberts volleyball first qualified for the National Volleyball Finals in 1998. Their better run came in the 2000 Nyanga Volleyball Finals where they lost out in the quarter finals to eventual winners Mufakose High 2 after a 3 sets match which they lost 2–1.

The school has many recreational facilities, including a swimming pool, a football field, and Olympic standard volleyball and netball grounds.

Debate and Public Speaking

During the years 2006 to 2008 the school reigned supreme in various debate and public speaking competitions. Under the guidance of Mr. Freeman Mondo the Public Speaking team won the provincial public speaking competition at junior level in 2006. The same industrious coach led the debate team in the national senior debate competition. The team won the provincial level of the competition beating Mazowe Boys High. The team proceeded to the National Competition hosted by Prince Edward where they made it to the final against Marist Brothers Kutama College. The team lost out on a points decision after they had points deducted from them for fielding form 3 and 4 students in a competition meant exclusively for form 5 and 6 students.

The team bounced back in the 2007 edition of the Nugget Debate Competition where the team did a clean sweep of all the prizes in the junior category, winning the title in the competition hosted by Midlands Christian College. The team captain was voted the best overall speaker at the competition.

In 2008 the team again competed at the provincial level of the debate and public speaking competitions. In the final of the Public Speaking Competition St Alberts lost out to Mazowe Boys High School who later on went to win the competition at national level. Saint Alberts won the female provincial competition and qualified to represent the province at the national level. However, due to economic variables, was unable to attend the national competition. The debate team defeated the Mazowe Boys High at the provincial finals held at Bradley High School. The team was, however, unable to attend the national competition at Marist Brothers Nyanga due to funding problems.
After a brief hiatus from the national competitions, another team was ensembled by Mr Zhou in 2010. The team stumbled in the Provincial final where it lost to Langham Girls.
In 2011, the senior team bounced back with aplomb and dominated the Provincial finals and qualified for the Nugget National competitions. The team bowed out at the quarter finals of the national competitions, with the team captain voted among the best speakers at the finals

References

External links
 https://www.facebook.com/groups/259191280795177/?notif_t=group_activity  (St Albert's High School)

Educational institutions established in the 1970s
Buildings and structures in Mashonaland Central Province
High schools in Zimbabwe
Catholic secondary schools in Zimbabwe
Boarding schools in Zimbabwe
Education in Mashonaland Central Province
1970s establishments in Rhodesia